is a Japanese politician of the Liberal Democratic Party, a member of the House of Representatives in the Diet (national legislature).

Political career
A native of Wajima, Ishikawa and graduate of Meiji University, Kitamura was elected to the House of Representatives for the first time in 2005 after having served in the assembly of Ishikawa Prefecture for seven terms since 1975.

His profile on the LDP website:
Member, Ishikawa Prefectural Assembly
Deputy Chairman, General Council of LDP
Deputy Chairman, Diet Affairs Committee of LDP
Acting Director, Cabinet Division of LDP
Chairman, Committee on Organizations Involved with NPO and NGO of LDP
Parliamentary Secretary of Internal Affairs and Communications
Parliamentary Secretary of Cabinet Office
Member of Japan-US Parliamentary Association, Japan-South Korea Parliamentary Association, Japan-Taiwan Parliamentary Commission

Positions

A member of the Diet groups affiliated to the openly revisionist lobby Nippon Kaigi, and to the fundamentalist league Shintō Seiji Renmei, Kitamura is in favor of the revision of the Constitution, of the right to collective-self-defense, of the change from a bicameral to a unicameral legislative system, of nuclear power plants, of relocating the US base in Okinawa, and against the participation of Japan to the Trans-Pacific Partnership, and against a nuclear-armed Japan

References

External links 
 Official website in Japanese.

Members of the House of Representatives (Japan)
Koizumi Children
People from Wajima, Ishikawa
Politicians from Ishikawa Prefecture
Living people
1945 births
Members of Nippon Kaigi
Liberal Democratic Party (Japan) politicians